Scopaeus is a genus of beetles belonging to the family Staphylinidae.

The genus has cosmopolitan distribution.

Species:
 Scopaeus abyssinicus Fagel, 1956 
 Scopaeus admixtus Fagel, 1973

References

Staphylinidae
Staphylinidae genera